The 1916 Ohio Green and White football team represented Ohio University as a member of the Ohio Athletic Conference (OAC) during the 1916 college football season. Led by fourth-year head coach M. B. Banks, the Green and White compiled an overall record of 5–2–1 with a mark of 4–1–1 in conference play, placing fourth in the OAC.

Schedule

References

Ohio
Ohio Bobcats football seasons
Ohio Green and White football